Taavi Rõivas (born 26 September 1979) is an Estonian politician, former Prime Minister of Estonia from 2014 to 2016 and former leader of the Reform Party. Before his term as the Prime Minister, Rõivas was the Minister of Social Affairs from 2012 to 2014. On 9 November 2016 his second cabinet dissolved after coalition partners, Union of Pro Patria and Res Publica and Social Democratic Party, sided with the opposition in a no confidence motion. At the end of 2020, Rõivas announced quitting politics, and resigned from his parliament seat.

Early life
Rõivas graduated from Tallinn Secondary Science School and from the Faculty of Economics and Business Administration of the University of Tartu in international economics and marketing.

Political career
Rõivas joined the Reform Party in 1998. His political career began as an advisor to Minister of Justice Märt Rask from 1999 to 2002. 
He was Mayor of Haabersti district of Tallinn 2004–2005 and advisor to the Minister of Population Affairs Paul-Eerik Rummo from 2003 to 2004. In 2005, he became an advisor to the Prime Minister and Reform Party Leader Andrus Ansip. He was elected to the Tallinn City Council in 2005 and to the Riigikogu in 2007 and again in 2011.

In December 2012, Rõivas became the youngest member of the Estonian Government as the Minister of Social Affairs, replacing Hanno Pevkur. Pevkur in turn replaced Minister of Justice Kristen Michal who had resigned due to corruption allegations by fellow Reform Party member Silver Meikar.

In February 2014, Prime Minister Andrus Ansip announced he would resign a year before the 2015 parliamentary elections and hand his post to the European Commissioner Siim Kallas, former Reform Party Leader and Prime Minister 2002–2003. Kallas began coalition talks with the Social Democratic Party, deciding to replace the conservative Pro Patria and Res Publica Union as Reform Party's coalition partner. On 12 March Kallas unexpectedly announced he would not seek the post, due to media scrutiny of his actions as President of the Bank of Estonia in the early 1990s. On the same day, the leadership of the Reform Party chose Rõivas as the new candidate for Prime Minister. The coalition agreement with the Social Democratic Party was signed on 20 March and the nomination was confirmed by the Riigikogu on 24 March. Rõivas became Prime Minister after the President Toomas Hendrik Ilves approved his proposed cabinet on 26 March 2014. At the time, Rõivas was the youngest government leader in the European Union.

Rõivas led his party to the 2015 parliamentary elections, in which Reform Party succeeded in staying as the largest party and began coalition talks with the Social Democratic Party, the Pro Patria and Res Publica Union and the Free Party. After nearly three weeks of negotiations, the Free Party left the coalition talks due to disagreements with the Reform Party and the Pro Patria and Res Publica Union. The three remaining parties signed the coalition treaty on 8 April, and Rõivas' second cabinet took office on 9 April.

On 7 November 2016, the Social Democratic Party (SDE) and Pro Patria & Res Publica Union (IRL) announced that they were asking Prime Minister Taavi Rõivas to resign for lack of trust among the coalition partners. The announcement came soon after the opposition had submitted a motion to express lack of confidence in Rõivas’ government. SDE and IRL proceeded with the motion, leaving the Reform the only party to support Rõivas. Rõivas commented the situation by declining to resign and arguing that a democratically elected government should be only removed by a democratic vote. In the following vote of confidence on 9 November, the majority of Riigikogu voted in favor of removing the prime minister’s government. On 23 November, the Center Party chairman Jüri Ratas was sworn in as the new Prime Minister, whereas Reform Party was left in the opposition. Rõivas subsequently announced that he would step down as the chairman of the party. On 7 January 2017 Hanno Pevkur was elected the new chairman of the Reform Party.

On 5 December 2016, Rõivas was elected as the deputy speaker of the Riigikogu. In September 2017, Rõivas led an Estonian trade delegation visit to Malaysia, during which the members of the delegation reportedly behaved in an undignified manner and were subsequently accused of harassment. Rõivas apologized for the behavior of the delegation and announced his resignation as the deputy speaker, but insisted on continuing as an MP for the Reform Party. Later he also apologized on live television to the victim of his alleged harassment, code-named Katrin in Estonian media.

Personal life
Rõivas speaks Estonian, English, Russian, Ukrainian and Finnish.

Rõivas has been engaged to the pop singer Luisa Värk since 2016. They have one daughter, Miina Rihanna, born in 2009.

Decorations
2016 Commander Grand Cross of the Order of the White Rose of Finland.

See also
Taavi Rõivas' first cabinet
Taavi Rõivas' second cabinet

References

|-

|-

1979 births
21st-century Estonian politicians
Estonian Reform Party politicians
Government ministers of Estonia
Living people
Members of the Riigikogu, 2007–2011
Members of the Riigikogu, 2011–2015
Members of the Riigikogu, 2015–2019
Members of the Riigikogu, 2019–2023
Leaders of political parties in Estonia
Politicians from Tallinn
Prime Ministers of Estonia
Recipients of the Order of the National Coat of Arms, 2nd Class
University of Tartu alumni